The Florida State University College of Human Sciences is the human sciences school of the Florida State University. The College was established in 1918. About 2,972 are enrolled in classes, including undergraduates, graduate students, and Ph.D.-seeking students.

The Department of Nutrition, Food and Exercise Sciences has the largest enrollment of pre-medical education students at FSU. It was also home to the now defunct "Housing" major, which was one of only four nationwide which focused on homes of all types as a product and how they impacted human health and behaviors.

National rankings
U.S. News & World Report (2015 edition)
 Clinical Psychology - 47th overall
 Rehab Counseling - 24th overall
 Speech-Language Pathology - 21st overall

In 2015, the Department of Retail, Merchandising and Product Development was ranked 7th in the nation by Fashion-Schools.org.

Department, schools, and programs
Department of Family & Child Sciences
Department of Nutrition, Food & Exercise Sciences
Department of Retail, Merchandising & Product Development
Center for Advancing Exercise and Nutrition Research on Aging (CAENRA)
Family Institute
Center on Better Health and Life for Underserved Populations (BHL Center)
Center for Couple & Family Therapy
Institute of Sports Sciences and Medicine
Center for Retail Merchandising and Product Development

References

External links

 
Educational institutions established in 1918
University subdivisions in Florida
1918 establishments in Florida